The Prague Championship is a fifth level league in the Czech Republic football league system. It is controlled by the Prague Football Association. The league comprises teams from Prague. In 2022 the league is made of 16 teams.

Prague championship clubs, 2016–17

Prague Championship champions

References 

 Information at the website of the Prague Football Association 
 Competition archive from 2004/05 at vysledky.cz 

5
Sport in Prague
Czech
Sports leagues established in 1993
1993 establishments in the Czech Republic
Football clubs in the Czech Republic
Association football clubs established in 1993